Duku Station (DUK) is a railway station located in Kasang, Batang Anai, Padang Pariaman Regency, West Sumatra. The station, which is located at an altitude of +7m, is included in the Regional Division II West Sumatra. To the northeast from line 1 of this station there is a new branch to Minangkabau International Airport which has been operating since 2018.

The station building has now been replaced with a new building with a typical Minangkabau Rumah Gadang architecture. The old station building which is an  heritage has now been torn down.

This line is served by train from the airport to  Station, which is 23 km from the airport. Starting 22 March 2019 the Lembah Anai rail bus also stopped at this station in connection with the extension of this railway link to the airport and this station automatically became the station with the busiest rail traffic in West Sumatra.

Services 
The following is a list of train services at the Duku Station.

Passenger services

References

External links 
 

Padang Pariaman Regency
Railway stations in West Sumatra